Le Ambiziose  is a 1961 Italian film, directed by Antonio Amendola.

Cast
 Marisa Merlini as Letizia Proietti
 Memmo Carotenuto as the police marshall
 Ave Ninchi as Ines
 Raffaele Pisu as Nando Moriconi
 Aroldo Tieri as Goffredo Innamorati
 Tino Scotti as Commendator Bartolazzi
 Dominique Boschero as Vanda
  as Gina
 Arianne Ulmer as Bettina
 Gabriella Farinon as Marina
  as Federici
 Tiberio Murgia as Brigadier Coccurullo
 Carlo Romano as the jury president
  as Rossana
 Raimondo Vianello as	 the actor

Censorship 
When Le Ambiziose was first released in Italy in 1961 the Committee for the Theatrical Review of the Italian Ministry of Cultural Heritage and Activities rated it as VM16: not suitable for children under 16. In addition the committee imposed the removal of the following lines and scenes: 1) Flora's line: “He was sophisticated, if he didn’t watch a pornographic film first... then nothing!”; 2) scenes in which the female artist in her studio flatters Miss Calabria (“What a nice tan you have; Lucky sun that can kiss whoever! What a body you have! Your skin is pure and smooth”) along with the scene in which Miss Calabria scared by the attention of the artist leaves the room; 3) any mentions of Prime Minister Amintore Fanfani made by the Festival organizers during the final meeting will be removed. The official document number is: 33723, it was signed on 3 January 1961 by Minister Renzo Helfer.

References

External links
 

1961 films
Films scored by Piero Umiliani
Italian comedy films
Films about beauty pageants
1960s Italian films